Clarke Quay  is a historical riverside quay in Singapore, located within the Singapore River Planning Area. The quay is situated upstream from the mouth of the Singapore River and Boat Quay.

Etymology
Clarke Quay was named after Sir Andrew Clarke, Singapore's second Governor and Governor of the Straits Settlements from 1873 to 1875, who played a key role in positioning Singapore as the main port for the Malay states of Perak, Selangor and Sungei Ujong.

Clarke Quay is also the name of a road along the quay, part of which has since been converted into a pedestrian mall. Clarke Street, located next to Clarke Quay, was officially named in 1896, and was originally two streets known simply as East Street and West Street in north Kampong Malacca. Similar to Clarke Quay, Clarke Street has since been converted into a pedestrian mall.

The Hoklos (Hokkien) refer to Clarke Street as gi hok kong si au (义福公司后), meaning "behind the new Gi Hok Kongsi" (house). The new Gi Hok Kongsi was near Carpenter Street. Another Chinese reference, which only refers to the Southern bank around Read Bridge area, was cha chun tau (柴船头), meaning "jetty for boats carrying firewood". Small tongkangs carrying firewood from Indonesia berthed at this jetty. The firewood trade was primarily a Teochew enterprise.

History
The Singapore River has been the centre of trade since modern Singapore was founded in 1819. During the colonial era, Boat Quay was the commercial centre where barge lighters would transport goods upstream to warehouses at Clarke Quay.

At the height of its prosperity, dozens of bumboats jostled for mooring space beside Clarke Quay. This continued well into the later half of the 20th century. By this time, the Singapore River had also become very polluted. The government decided to relocate cargo services to a new modern facility in Pasir Panjang. The bumboats and lorries departed to their new home and Clarke Quay fell silent.

The government then cleaned up the Singapore River and its environment from 1977 to 1987. Plans were made to revamp the area and turn it into a flourishing commercial, residential and entertainment precinct. These plans took into serious consideration the historical value of Clarke Quay, making it mandatory that new buildings complement the historical character of the area and that certain old buildings be restored.

Clarke Quay Festival Village, the biggest conservation project for the Singapore River, was developed and officially opened on 10 December 1993. Clarke Quay Festival Village was managed by Clarke Quay Pte Ltd, a subsidiary of DBS Land. In 2000, DBS Land merged with Pidemco Land to form CapitaLand and management of Clarke Quay went to CapitaLand. 

In 1996, the advertising agency Saatchi & Saatchi, and their sister company Zenith, moved into Clarke Quay as the pioneers to develop a creative hub. Two years later, they were awarded Ad Age International Agency of the Year. They had taken over the karaoke Party Doll premises.

Ten years later, works were commenced to revamp the Clarke Quay area to give the place a better tenant mix. The development also saw major changes to the exterior and riverside areas.

In 2003, British architectural firm Alsop Architects was hired to revamp Clarke Quay. The firm was commissioned to redesign the shophouse facades, streetscapes and riverfront dining areas in two development phases. The newly redeveloped Clarke Quay consistently attracts over 2 million visitors a year and is a major social and tourist component of brand Singapore. Crucial to its success is the ingenious moderation of the micro-climate through the design of sophisticated shading and cooling systems which reduce the ambient temperature by 4 degrees Celsius while enhancing the riverfront and streets with tremendous visual interests. The project won in 2007 Cityscape Architectural Review Award (Tourism, Travel & Transport – Built) and the Cityscape Asia Awards, Best Waterfront Development in 2008.

The Satay Club and a number of establishments vacated Clarke Quay to make way for new tenants.

A new SOHO concept development cum shopping centre called Clarke Quay Central, above the MRT station, was completed in 2007.

In July 2012, Hong Kong lifestyle retail store GOD opened a 6,000 square foot flagship store in the Quay. It closed on 26 April 2015.

On 17 December 2016, Zouk opened at Clark Quay after moving from its previous location at Jiak Kim Road.

Today

At present, five blocks of restored warehouses house various restaurants and nightclubs. There are also moored Chinese junks (tongkangs) that have been refurbished into floating pubs and restaurants. The Cannery is one of the anchor tenants of the place. There are over 5 different concepts in one block.  Another anchor tenant, The Arena, will be home to Singapore's First Permanent Illusion Show (starting August 2008) starring J C Sum and 'Magic Babe' Ning. The G-MAX reverse bungee, the first in Singapore, is located at the entrance which opened in November 2003. 

Notable restaurants and nightclubs include Hooters and Indochine. River cruises and river taxis on the Singapore River can be accessed from Clarke Quay. One of its most popular attractions is its exciting host of CQ's signature events happening once every quarter.

Transport
Clarke Quay MRT station on the North East line is located within the vicinity.

References

Sources
National Heritage Board (2002), Singapore's 100 Historic Places, Archipelago Press, 
Victor R Savage, Brenda S A Yeoh (2003), Toponymics – A Study of Singapore Street Names, Eastern Universities Press,

External links

Clarke Quay website

Tourist attractions in Singapore
Protected areas of Singapore
Roads in Singapore
Singapore River
Redeveloped ports and waterfronts in Singapore